Henry David Erskine, 12th Earl of Buchan (July 1783 – 13 September 1857) was the grandson of the 10th Earl of Buchan. He inherited the Earldom upon the death of his uncle, David Erskine, 11th Earl of Buchan who died without issue.

On 28 September 1809 he married Elizabeth Cole Shipley (d.1828), daughter of Major-General Sir Charles Shipley. They had one child, David Stuart Erskine, 13th Earl of Buchan (1815–1898).

In 1833 he was living at 47 Minto Street in southern Edinburgh. The primary residence of the Earl was Kirkhill House in Broxburn, West Lothian. The Earl inherited the property from his uncle, the 11th Earl.

The Earl is buried in a standalone memorial burial chapel (built 1857) to the east of the church of St John Cantius and St Nicholas Catholic Church in Broxburn.

References

12th Earl of Buchan
1783 births
1857 deaths
Henry